was a railway station on the Chitose Line located in Chitose, Hokkaidō, Japan. The station was numbered H15.

Lines
Bibi Station was served by the Chitose Line.

Station layout
The station consisted of two ground-level platforms serving three tracks. The station had Kitaca card readers (not equipped with regular ticket gates).

Platforms

Adjacent stations

References

Railway stations in Hokkaido Prefecture
Railway stations in Japan opened in 1926
Chitose, Hokkaido